Gheorghe Ciolac (10 August 1908 – 13 April 1965) was a Romanian association football striker. He was a member of the Romania national football team which competed at the 1934 FIFA World Cup, but did not play any match.

Club career

After playing as a youth for Politehnica Timișoara between 1922 and 1924, Gheorghe Ciolac started his senior career at Banatul, another team from Timișoara. He played for this team until 1930, when he moved to Ripensia Timișoara.

Gheorghe Ciolac was the captain of the team which won, between 1932 and 1938, four Divizia A titles and two Romanian Cups. He made his debut in the first tier of Romanian football on 11 September 1932, in a match between his team and CFR București.

Ciolac scored the winning goal for Ripensia Timișoara in the first Romanian Cup final, but the match was contested by Ripensia's opponents, Universitatea Cluj, which asked for playing the match on a neutral stadium. The match was replayed two months later in Bucharest, and Ripensia won 5–0.

In 1936 Romanian Cup final, Ciolac scored two goals as Ripensia Timișoara demolished its opponents, Unirea Tricolor București, winning the match by 5 goals to 1.

Ciolac retired from football in 1941, after playing his last match against Venus București, on 15 June.

International career
Gheorghe Ciolac made his debut for the Romania national football team in May 1928, in a match against Yugoslavia, lost by Romanians, 1–3. In his second match for Romania, Ciolac scored a hat-trick, as Romania won 3–0 in front of Bulgaria. In September 1929, he was for the first time the captain of the national team, in a match against Bulgaria, played on the Levski Stadium in Sofia.

Gheorghe Ciolac was selected in the Romanian team for the 1934 FIFA World Cup, but did not play, remaining on the bench in the match against Czechoslovakia. He played his last match for the national team in 1937, being also the captain of the team in the match against Czechoslovakia (1–1).

He was part of the Romanian team that won three Balkan Cups in the 1930s, contributing with 1 goal in 1929–31 and 1936, and with four goals in the 1933 edition, being the tournament's shared top goal scorer alongside teammate Ștefan Dobay. This tally includes a hat-trick in a 7-0 win over Bulgaria on 4 June 1933. With 9 goals in the Balkan Cup, he is among the all-time top goal scorer in the competition's history.

International Goals
''Romania score listed first, score column indicates score after each Ciolac goal.

Honours
Ripensia Timișoara
Liga I (4): 1932–33, 1934–35, 1935–36, 1937–38
Cupa României (2): 1933–34, 1935–36

International
Romania

Balkan Cup:
Champions (3): 1929–31, 1933 and 1936

Individual
Top goalscorer of the 1933 Balkan Cup with 4 goals

References

External links
 
 

1908 births
1965 deaths
People from Timiș County
Romanian footballers
Liga I players
FC Politehnica Timișoara players
Banatul Timișoara players
FC Ripensia Timișoara players
Association football forwards
Romania international footballers
1934 FIFA World Cup players